Valley Parade, known as the University of Bradford Stadium for sponsorship reasons, is an all-seater football stadium in Bradford, West Yorkshire, England. Built in 1886, it was the home of Manningham Rugby Football Club until 1903, when they changed code from rugby football to association football and became Bradford City. It has been Bradford City's home since, although it is now owned by former chairman Gordon Gibb's pension fund. It has also been home to Bradford (Park Avenue) for one season, and Bradford Bulls rugby league side for two seasons, as well as host to a number of England youth team fixtures.

Football architect Archibald Leitch was commissioned to redevelop the ground when Bradford City were promoted to the First Division in 1908. The stadium underwent few changes until the fatal fire on 11 May 1985, when 56 supporters were killed and at least 265 were injured. It underwent a £2.6 million redevelopment and was re-opened in December 1986. The ground underwent significant changes in the 1990s, and early 2000s, and now has a capacity of 25,136. The record attendance of 39,146 was set in 1911 for an FA Cup tie against Burnley, making it the oldest surviving attendance record at a Football League ground in the country. The highest attendance at Valley Parade, as it is now, is 24,343, set at a pre-season friendly against Liverpool in 2019.

History
Manningham Rugby Football Club, formed in 1876, originally played games at Cardigan Fields, in the Carlisle Road area of Bradford. When their ground was sold to facilitate the construction of Drummond School, the club required a new home. Consequently, they bought one-third of the Valley Parade site in Manningham, taking a short-term lease out on the rest of the land in time to play there for the 1886–87 season. The new ground and the road it was built upon both adopted the name of the local area, Valley Parade, a name deriving from the steep hillside below Manningham. The land was previously a quarry, and formed part of a greater site owned by Midland Railway Company.

The club spent £1,400 appointing designers to oversee the excavation and levelling of the land, and moved a one-year-old stand from Carlisle Road to the highest part of the new ground. The original ground comprised the relocated stand, a 2,000-capacity stepped enclosure with the players' changing rooms beneath the stand, the playing area, a cinder athletics track and fencing to limit the total capacity to 18,000. The playing field was made of ballast, ashes, soil and sods. The ground was officially opened on 27 September 1886 for a game against Wakefield Trinity which was watched by a capacity crowd, but construction work meant most of Manningham's early games were away fixtures.

On Christmas Day 1888, 12-year old Thomas Coyle was killed at the ground when the barrier under which he was sitting collapsed on him breaking his neck. An inquest decided the death was accidental and the accident happened due to the weight of spectators leaning on the barrier. The takings from the game totalling £115 were distributed to Coyle's family and the families of other boys injured in the incident.

Manningham RFC continued playing until 1903, when financial difficulties, caused by relegation at the turn of the century, prompted club officials to change codes from rugby football to association football. The first association football game to be played at Valley Parade was a promotional fixture on 6 April 1903 between a side of West Yorkshire footballers and Sheffield United's 1903 FA Cup winning side. The game had been organised to stimulate interest in the sport in Bradford and attracted 8,000 fans. The new football club, Bradford City, were elected to The Football League's Division Two the following month. Bradford City's first game at Valley Parade came on 5 September 1903 against Gainsborough Trinity, drawing a crowd of 11,000. As a result of alterations first implemented in 1897, City players originally changed in a shed behind one end of the ground, and visiting teams used the old rugby club dressing rooms at the back of the nearby Belle Vue Hotel. However, after City's 5–1 defeat by Manchester United on 10 February 1906, United player Bob Bonthron was attacked as he left the ground. As a result, The Football Association closed the ground for 14 days, ordering City to switch its changing rooms to the nearby Artillery Barracks for the 1906–07 season. Several supporters faced criminal proceedings for the incident.

After Bradford City won the Division Two championship in 1907–08, the club hurried through a reconstruction programme of the ground to prepare for the club's first season in Division One. Football architect Archibald Leitch was commissioned to design new terracing in the paddock—a standing area in front of the 5,300-seater main stand which was built in 1908—and build a Spion Kop at the north side of the ground and an 8,000-capacity stand at the Midland Road end opposite the main stand. Further work was performed to lower the railings, erect barriers, move the pitch and add extra turnstiles. The changing rooms were also moved, with a tunnel leading from the rooms underneath the Kop along the main stand side of the ground. The total project cost £9,958, and raised the capacity to 40,000. The work was not completed until midway through the 1908–09 season. The first match after work was finished took place on Christmas Day 1908, when 36,000 fans saw City host Bristol City. The improvements allowed Bradford City to set their record attendance of 39,146 on 11 March 1911 against Burnley during the club's FA Cup winning run. It is the longest surviving attendance record at any league ground in the country.

On 17 March 1932, Bradford City paid Midland Railway Company £3,750 for the remaining two-thirds of the site to become outright owners of the ground, which was now 45 years old. The stadium had remained virtually unchanged since 1908, and did so until 1952, when the capacity of the ground was reduced after examinations of the foundations were ordered following the 1946 Burnden Park disaster. The investigation resulted in the closure of half the Midland Road stand. The stand's steel frame was then sold to Berwick Rangers for £450 and a smaller replacement stand was built at Valley Parade in 1954. Six years later, the stand had to be demolished for a second time because of continuing foundation problems. It was another six years before all four stands at Valley Parade were able to be opened for the first time. To enable construction of a new stand on the Midland Road side of the ground, the club directors moved the pitch  closer to the main stand. The new stand was then the narrowest stand in the league. Further improvements were made to the stand in 1969, ready for the club's FA Cup tie with Division One side Tottenham Hotspur on 3 January 1970, which ended in a 2–2 draw in front of 23,000 fans. The cost of the work forced the club to sell Valley Parade to Bradford Corporation for £35,000, but it was bought back by 1979 for the same price.

During the period from 1908 to 1985, the club carried out a number of other lesser work to the rest of the ground. It also included the introduction of floodlights in English football. Valley Parade's first floodlights cost £3,000 and were lamps mounted on telegraph poles running along each side of the ground. They were originally used against Hull City on 20 December 1954. The floodlights were replaced in 1960 and again used for the first time against Hull City, but when one fell over in 1962, an FA Cup game with Gateshead had to go ahead with only three pylons, prompting an FA inquiry. In 1985, football ground writer Simon Inglis described the view from the main stand, which was still the same as when it was developed in 1908, as "like watching football from the cockpit of a Sopwith Camel" because of its antiquated supports and struts.

On 11 May 1985, one of the worst sporting disasters occurred at Valley Parade, 56 people died and at least 265 were injured when the main stand was engulfed by fire. The fire started 40 minutes into the club's final game of the 1984–85 season against Lincoln City and destroyed the main stand in just nine minutes. For the next season and the first five months of the 1986–87 season, Bradford City played home games at Leeds United's Elland Road, Huddersfield Town's Leeds Road and Bradford Northern's Odsal Stadium, while Valley Parade was rebuilt. Huddersfield-based firm J Wimpenny carried out the £2.6 million work, which included funding from insurance pay-outs, Football League stadium grants, club funds and a £1.46 million Government loan obtained by two Bradford MPs, Geoffrey Lawler and Max Madden. A new 5,000 all-seater main stand was built, longer than the structure which had burned down. The Kop was also covered for the first time and increased to a 7,000 capacity. Other minor work was carried out to the ground's other two stands. On 14 December 1986, 582 days after the fire, The Hon Sir Oliver Popplewell, who had conducted the inquiry into the fire, opened the new stadium before an exhibition match against an England international XI. It was first used for a league game on Boxing Day when City lost 1–0 to Derby County.

The two stands which were not altered after the fire were both improved during the 1990s. The Bradford end of the ground was made a double-decker, all-seater stand, with a new scoreboard, in 1991. City's promotion to Division One in 1996 meant that chairman Geoffrey Richmond announced the construction of a 4,500 seater stand on the Midland Road side. It was first used for a Yorkshire derby against Sheffield United on Boxing Day 1996, before being officially opened by Queen Elizabeth II on 27 March 1997. Richmond continued his plans to redevelop the ground as City continued to rise through the league. The roof of the Kop, which was the largest safe-standing terrace in the country at the time, was removed and the capacity reduced during City's 1998–99 promotion season, to prepare for a summer £6.5 million rebuilding programme. The Kop was converted into a two-tier 7,500-seat capacity stand. An additional 2,300-seat capacity corner section was built, which filled in the corner between the main stand and Kop. When opened in December 2000 it took the capacity of Valley Parade to more than 20,000 for the first time since 1970. A suite of offices and a shop were added at the same time. Once the work was completed, a second tier was added to the main stand at the cost of £6.5 million. It was opened in 2001, increasing the main stand's capacity to 11,000, and the ground's capacity to 25,000.

Richmond also planned to increase the main stand's capacity by a further 1,800 seats by building new changing rooms and office blocks, and add a second tier to the Midland Road stand, to increase the ground capacity to more than 35,000. However, the club went into administration in May 2002, and Richmond was replaced by new co-owners Julian Rhodes and Gordon Gibb. The following year, Valley Parade was sold to Gibb's pension fund for £5 million, with the club's offices, shop and car park sold to London-based Development Securities for an additional £2.5 million. Bradford City's annual rent bill in 2011 to Gibb's pension fund is £370,000. The total budget for the year, including other rent payments, rates, maintenance and utility bills is £1.25 million.

The ground has been renamed a number of times for sponsorship reasons. Sponsors have included The Pulse radio station, Bradford & Bingley, Intersonic and Coral Windows. The ground was renamed due to sponsorship as the Northern Commercials Stadium in July 2016 but was still commonly known throughout football as Valley Parade. In July 2019 it was re-sponsored and renamed the Utilita Energy Stadium. This deal concluded in July 2022 and the stadium was subsequently renamed the University of Bradford Stadium.

Structure and facilities

The stadium is divided into five all-seater stands, the JCT600 Stand, the Kop, the Midland Road Stand, the North West Corner and the TL Dallas Stand. All five stands are covered except for a small part of the main stand, and all but the Midland Road Stand being two-tiered. Most of the stands are cantilever structures, and because of the ground's location on the hillside, the Midland Road Stand overhangs the road.

Many of the stands have more traditional names, but have since been renamed because of sponsorship deals. The JCT600 Stand is the ground's main stand, and is often called the latter by fans, but is also known as the Sunwin stand owing to the former sponsor. The Kop, was the former standing area, and its name was derived, like at many stadia across the country, from the Battle of Spion Kop. The East Stand, sponsored by Northern Commercials, is also named the Midland Road stand, because of the road on that side of the ground. The TL Dallas Stand is also known as the Bradford end, because it is nearest to the city centre.

The total capacity of Valley Parade is 25,136. The largest stand is the JCT600 Stand, which holds 9,004 supporters, followed by the Kop, which has a capacity of 7,492. The Midland Road Stand holds 4,500, and the North West Corner 2,300. The TL Dallas Stand is the smallest of the five stands with a capacity of 1,840. The stadium includes 134 seats for media representatives.

The Sunwin Stand has further room for expansion, and is unusual because it only runs three-quarters of the length of the pitch. The rest of this side is taken up by a brick building, situated in the south west corner of the stadium, which houses the club changing rooms and the security offices. The Sunwin Stand also includes the ground's 17 executive boxes and conference facilities, which have capacity for up to 700 people. A second function room, called the Bantams Bar, in the Kop, has room for another 300 people. There is also more office space, a club store, ticket office and museum in the car park behind the Kop. From early 2010, the area near the store will also include a dental surgery, which will be run by NHS Bradford and Airedale in partnership with the football club.

Visiting team fans sat in the TL Dallas Stand from 1995 to 2008, but have also been given other parts of the ground for larger matches. In March 2008, the club announced that the TL Dallas Stand would be made available for home fans for the 2008–09 season. The decision came after an overwhelmingly positive text message poll from the club's supporters to use the Bradford End of the ground. Visiting team fans have been accommodated in the end blocks of the East Stand since the start of the 2008–09 season.

Fire disaster

On 11 May 1985, a crowd of 11,076 attended Bradford City's final Division Three game of the 1984–85 season against Lincoln City. The Bradford side had secured the Division Three title the week before when they defeated Bolton Wanderers 2–0. The league trophy was presented to City's skipper Peter Jackson before the Lincoln game. The score was still 0–0 after 40 minutes of the game, when a small fire was noticed three rows from the back near one end of the main stand. The flames became more visible within minutes, and police started to evacuate people in the stand less than six minutes later. Club chairman Stafford Heginbotham, who was in the main stand, described the effect and his reaction to the disaster: "The fire just spread along the length of the stand in seconds. The smoke was choking. We couldn't breathe. It was to be our day." The game was stopped, and the wooden roof caught fire. The fire spread the length of the stand, and timber and the roof began to fall onto the crowds. Black smoke enveloped the rear passageways, where fans were trying to escape. Ultimately, the fire killed 56 spectators, ranging from 11-year-old children to the 86-year-old former chairman of the club, Sam Firth. At least 265 further supporters were injured. The few existing narrow escape routes led to locked doors in some cases, and the only escape for most spectators was directly onto the field. The match was abandoned and never replayed, with The Football League ordering the scoreline at the time of abandonment to stand.

Sir Oliver Popplewell published his inquiry into the fire in 1986, which introduced new safety legislation for sports grounds across the country. Forensic scientist David Woolley believed the cause of the fire was from a discarded cigarette or match, which had dropped through gaps between the seating to a void below the stand where rubbish had built up. A number of police officers and 22 spectators were later awarded bravery awards for their deeds on the day.

The old wooden roof of the stand was due to be replaced the day after the Lincoln match, because it did not meet the safety regulations required for Division Two, where the team would be playing in the following season. Instead, it took until July 1986 for rebuilding work to begin. The ground was used for reserve team fixtures from September 1985, but only journalists and club officials were present to watch. Bradford City's senior team played home games at other grounds in West Yorkshire for 19 months while Valley Parade was rebuilt. The new ground cost £2.6 million (£ million today) to rebuild, and was reopened in December 1986.

More than £3.5 million (£ million today) was raised for victims of the fire and their families through the Bradford Disaster Appeal Fund. Memorials have been erected at the ground and at Bradford City Hall, the latter of which was provided by Bradford's twin town of Hamm, in Germany. The disaster is also marked by an annual remembrance ceremony on 11 May at Bradford City Hall, and an annual Easter-weekend youth tournament, contested between Bradford, Lincoln and other teams from across Europe.

Other uses
Valley Parade hosted its first international football game just two months after its first Football League match. The game's governing bodies wanted to promote the sport in the West Riding of Yorkshire, so chose Valley Parade to host a game between an English League side and an Irish League side, despite the ground not being up to standard. An estimated 20,000 spectators attended the match on 10 October 1903, which the English League won 2–1. Over the next 20 years the ground hosted a number of other representative games, including an England international trial, the 1904 FA Amateur Cup Final and an under-15s schoolboy international between England and Scotland. But it was not until 6 April 1987 that the ground hosted another international when England under-18s drew 1–1 with Switzerland. Other under-18 fixtures have been played since, the last of which was between England and Belgium in November 2000. It hosted two England under-21 international friendlies. The first was against Denmark's under-21s on 8 October 1999. The hosts thrashed the visitors 4–1. The other was against Italy's under-21s 26 March 2002. it ended in a 1 - 1 draw with 21,642 in attendance. Valley Parade's next international came seven years later when Bradford City hosted an under-19s European Championship qualifying game, in which England defeated Slovakia 4–1. The England women's team have also played at Valley Parade, including their first home match under the auspices of The Football Association in 1994 against Spain.

Bradford (Park Avenue) have played 29 games at Valley Parade, including a 2–0 friendly victory over Swiss side AC Lugano in 1962, and all their home fixtures in 1973–74, their last season before extinction. Bradford's rugby league side Bradford Northern played a number of fixtures at Valley Parade between 1920 and 1937, as well as three games in the 1980s, and 1990s. Bradford Northern became Bradford Bulls with the advent of the Super League, and played two seasons at Valley Parade in 2001 and 2002 during redevelopment of their home ground at Odsal.

Records

The record attendance at Valley Parade is 39,146, for Bradford City's FA Cup fourth round tie against Burnley on 11 March 1911. The highest league attendance of 37,059, was for a Bradford derby match between Bradford City and Bradford (Park Avenue) on 17 September 1927 in Division Three (North). The record attendance since the Valley Parade grounds were rebuilt in 1986 (all-seated attendance) is 24,343, set on 14 July 2019 during a pre-season friendly against Liverpool. The highest attendance for a competitive fixture is 24,321, set on 7 March 2015 in the 2015 FA Cup Quarter-finals draw against Reading, surpassing the previous record of 23,971, set on 10 December 2012 in the club's 2012–13 Football League Cup Quarter-finals victory over Arsenal. The lowest attendance for a league home match at Valley Parade is 1,249, on 15 May 1981, for a Division Four fixture with Hereford United. The record gate receipts that Bradford City have received are £181,990 for the Premier League game with Manchester United on 13 January 2001.

Official attendance figures for league games were not kept by The Football League until 1925. City's official highest average attendance at Valley Parade since then is 18,551 for the 1928–29 promotion season from Division Three (North), although the club reported an average of 22,585 in 1920–21. It was not until City were promoted to the Premier League in 1999 that the club again recorded average attendances of higher than 18,000. City recorded an average of 18,030 in 1999–2000, and 18,511 the following season.

During their two years at Valley Parade, the Bradford Bulls recorded their highest attendance on 4 March 2001 against St. Helens with a crowd of 16,572. The Bulls averaged 11,488 in 2002 for Super League VII. The highest crowd for a Bradford Northern fixture at Valley Parade was 20,973 on 13 February 1926 for a Challenge Cup game against Keighley, which finished 2–2.

Transport
Bradford is served by two railway stations. Bradford Interchange connects to Leeds railway station for London North Eastern Railway and CrossCountry train services, Grand Central provide a direct service to London, and provides First Bradford and Keighley Bus Company buses to the ground. Forster Square, which provides train services operated by Northern, also connects to Leeds. The stadium has no parking facilities available to supporters on matchdays. In 2000, as part of the expansion of Valley Parade, the club drew up a green transport plan in a bid to ease traffic congestion around the ground. Proposals included a new railway station on the line between Leeds and Bradford Forster Square, and a discounted bus service. No station has ever been built, and a discounted bus route was withdrawn because of low patronage.

References

External links

Bradford City A.F.C.
Bradford (Park Avenue) A.F.C.
Bradford Bulls
Football venues in England
Sports venues in Bradford
Defunct rugby league venues in England
Premier League venues
Sports venues completed in 1886
English Football League venues
Manningham, Bradford
1886 establishments in England
Burned buildings and structures in the United Kingdom